Durham Johnston Comprehensive School is a secondary school in Durham, England.

Introduction
Durham Johnston is a 1700-place 11–18 school serving Durham City and communities beyond to the south and west.  It is situated on Crossgate Moor, on the A167 (the former Great North Road). Durham Johnston traces its history to the foundation of a county grammar school for girls and boys in Durham City, partly funded by the will of Susan, widow of James Finlay Weir Johnston, in 1901 in South Street. Johnston is a Language College and a lead school for Gifted and Talented education, with full International Status. It is usually oversubscribed and runs on strict admissions criteria based entirely on students' addresses, managed by the County Council.

History
Durham Johnston was founded in 1901 with money left to the County Council by Susan, widow of JFW Johnston who died in 1855.  He was a pioneering educator, influential also in the development of Durham University and the colleges which became Newcastle University.  He worked to bring education to a wide range of people – rich and poor, male and female – and believed that it should be secular, useful and scientific as well as historical and literary. The first Johnston was, unusually, a mixed grammar technical school until 1918, when a girls’ grammar school was built which is now the Durham Gilesgate Sixth Form Centre.

The Johnston School opened in 1901 with 13 pupils. They came from a range of backgrounds.  James Jefferson and William Potts were the sons of schoolmasters, John Wetherell's father was the manager of the City Swimming Baths; Arnold Shaw's father was a clergyman while Mary Martin's father owned Martin's Flour Mill in the City.  Elizabeth Herbert's father was a clerk and Lydia Pearson's a signalman.  Frances Guthrie was simply described as ‘orphan’.

The first building was in South Street, which was then extended into some former housing and Mr Dean's Stocking Factory. Though the school had a beautiful view it was cold, damp and unsuitable for education. Rebuilding was held up by the second world war but ‘The Johnstonian’ of spring 1948 reported:

So the third headmaster of the school, Christopher Storey ended his first prize day speech with the words

When the school was finally begun in 1950 it was described as 

On the school’s 50th anniversary one of the teachers wrote in the Johnstonian

There were 34 boys in the sixth form when the new school opened.

Headmaster Storey’s hope was fulfilled:

Durham Johnston school now is very different.  The Johnston community as it is now was put together after 1979 when grammar schools in County Durham were abolished.   The Modern Schools in Brandon and Whinney Hill closed, followed by Lansdowne School in Bowburn.   Durham Johnston Comprehensive School worked as a split-site school for 30 years with years 7 and 8 at Whinney Hill and years 9 to upper sixth in the Grammar School buildings.  (The old annexe buildings were bought in 1968 when the Cottage Homes Orphanage closed, and was fitted out as a sixth form centre which opened in 1969, the year that girls returned to Johnston.)

In 1982, Durham County Council proposed to close the sixth form of the school, and those of Framwellgate Moor and Gilesgate, and create a sixth form college on the site Wearside site of Gilesgate school. Sir Keith Joseph rejected the proposal on the grounds that it would have been too disruptive and costly.

Successive years and governments brought planning blight and hopes deferred once again until the school buildings reached an advances state of dilapidation.  However, after the efforts of Head Richard Bloodworth (1999–2004) and Chair of Governors Roberta Blackman-Woods (later MP for the City of Durham) it was rebuilt in 2006-9.

Carolyn Roberts, Head since 2005, said to the students as the school moved in 2009:
 

When the Lower School Council came from Whinney Hill to visit the new building they said:

Gordon Brown's Labour Cabinet held a meeting and public consultation in February 2010 and praised the school for its commitment to academic excellence, social justice and global future. It was the first cabinet meeting in the North East, and the first in a school.

In October 1998, it was the first comprehensive school to enter the Financial Times top 1,000 schools.

The new school cost £24m.

Durham Johnston's War Memorial 1921–2011
Durham Johnston in 2011 raised funds to re-site and rededicate the school war memorial, which names 107 men. The majority were members of the Durham Light Infantry, although they served in both wars and in a variety of services and regiments. The memorial was first suggested in a speech by Mr Whalley, the school's Headmaster, in 1920. He referred to the death of Captain C.N. Crawshaw, a teacher at the school who had volunteered when the war broke out in 1914. Mr Whalley proposed a memorial in honour of the 34 former students and one teacher who had died during the Great War. A meeting was held on Wednesday 24 March 1920 for former and current students and £160 was raised towards the cost of the memorial. The original panels of the war memorial were unveiled at 6 p.m. on Saturday 22nd [month?] 1921 by the Bishop of Durham. It was located on the stage of the school, when the school was located in South Street. It acted as a memorial for the 35 ex-Johnstonians who had died during the Great War. In addition to the former students, one member of staff, Mr Crawshaw, had died in action. Two teachers returned to the school after the war, Mr Hutchinson and Mr Dent, and a third, Mr Cousins, returned, but retired, due to war related stress, in 1921.

The unveiling of the memorial was recorded by the Durham Advertiser:
The memorial has been erected by subscriptions from parents, staff past and present and pupils of the school. It consists of a mural panelling in light oak, of classic design, together with a memorial desk and chairs of a similar character. On the memorial desk is a brass inscription plate on which is engraved: ‘A tribute from the boys of 1918–1920 to the Johnstonians who served and fell in the war, 1914–1918.' The design and erection of the memorial have been ably carried out by the North of England School Furnishing Company. In addition to the brass inscription plate there is an engraving which states 'Nothing is here for tears, nothing but fair and well, and what may quiet us in a death so noble.' The motto for the memorial is taken from Milton’s Samson Agonistes. The memorial has been erected in the school assembly hall, and will daily remind the boys of the patriotism and self sacrifices of Johnstonians during the dark days of the war.

A large number of former Johnstonians were involved in World War II with a significant number losing their lives. Two new panels were commissioned for the war memorial and money was, again, raised from contributions. The two panels were dedicated in June 1948 with a ceremony, performed by the Reverend R.F. Morgan – a former student at the school – at St Margaret's Church. A significant amount of money was raised from subscriptions. After the new panels had been paid for the residue of the money was used for a War Memorial prize, which was awarded annually to a high achieving student at the school.

A tradition was established after 1948 that fresh flowers would always be put next to the memorial during term time and that a British Legion wreath of Flanders poppies would be placed next to the memorial on Remembrance Day.

In July 1954 the school moved from its South Street site to new buildings in Crossgate Moor. The memorial was removed in July 1954 and placed upon the left wall in the new school hall. It remained in place until the spring term of 2009, when it was removed and stored in preparation to be rededicated in the new Durham Johnston school hall. It was reinstalled in the third building and dedicated in March 2011 in recognition of the 90th anniversary of Johnston, with students and members of the local community raising the money for the initial memorial. A new plaque has been installed with a quotation from the Proverbs to acknowledge money raised by the current students. Local companies, particularly Harrison and Harrison Organ Builders, helped to support this project.

Notable on the war memorial is Captain Isidore Newman, an old boy of the school and linguist who was attached to the SOE during the second world war.  He was eventually captured and murdered at Mauthausen Concentration Camp.  Because of this, the rededication of the memorial in 2011 was attended by representatives of AJEX, the Association of Jewish Ex-Servicemen and the Rabbi to the Army performed a blessing in the school, as well as the local Anglican Vicar.

Traditions
The school is named after James Finlay Weir Johnston, a professor of Chemistry at Durham University.  He was an autodidact polymath committed to free secular education. Its motto is Sapere Aude, meaning "Dare to be wise".

History and Names in the New Johnston
Durham Johnston has a long history – a great school on a vital historical site. 
The new building is large, so to make the different areas more memorable the school named some of them after parts of its history.

Johnstonian Names
Some areas in the new building are named after James Finlay Weir Johnston (1796–1855)who bequeathed money to set up a school for girls and boys, teaching science and the arts to ordinary young people of Durham, rich or poor.

The main street on the ground floor is James Street, on the first floor is Finlay Street, on the top floor Weir Street.  The assembly hall is therefore the James Hall.  The quotation outside the door is the name of JFW Johnston's most successful book – an 800-page 2-volume work called ‘The Chemistry of Common Life’.  The Library is called Lydia, for Lydia Pearson.  She was the first pupil to enter Johnston's first new building in South Street in 1901.

Battlefield Names
Some of the areas are named after the great battle of Neville's Cross which was fought on the site in 1346.  It was between the English and the Scots: the English won.

The ground floor of the 2-storey block is David Street, named after the defeated Scottish king.  The ground floor of the 3-storey block is Edward Street, named after the victorious English king, though he was not at the battle.  The PE corridor is called Neville Street after one of the English commanders.  He was described in the Lanercost Chronicle as "strong, truthful, cautious and brave".  The music and drama corridor is Zouche Street, named after the Archbishop of York, another English military commander. The top floor of the 2-storey block is Douglas Street, named after one of the Scottish commanders. The staff room corridor is called Beaurepaire, the French name for the monastery which then became Bearpark.  The Learning Support and Sixth Form corridor is Rokeby Street, named after another English commander.  The first floor of the 3-storey block is Mowbray Street, another English commander.  The top floor of the 3-storey block is Auld Alliance.  That describes the link between the Scots and France, united in attacking England.  The single pod venue is Philippa.  She was the English queen, much more involved in the battle than Edward.

Academic performance
The school ranks in the top 100 schools in the United Kingdom. and is very highly ranked in lists which distinguish clearly between comprehensive and selective schools.  GCSE 5 A*-C with English and Maths are usually in the top 3 in the county, A level results are always very high.  Johnston achieves the highest results of any state school in the region and has a distinguished track record in getting students from all backgrounds into the most competitive courses.  Sutton Trust report 2009 cited it as the only state school in the region reliably to do so year after year. Oxbridge entry is usually between 10–15 each year.  The sixth form and its success is the lasting legacy of the longest-serving and most well-known Head, Dr John Dunford (1983–1999).

In 2010 student Robert Pattinson won the international Saatchi Art prize.

Johnston was inspected by OFSTED in February 2015 and judged 'outstanding'.

Notable former pupils

 David Macey (1949-2011), radical intellectual, translator, and biographer of Jacques Lacan, Michel Foucault, and Frantz Fanon.

 Professor Paul Attfield  University of Edinburgh
 Sir Kingsley Charles Dunham, geologist, Professor of Geology from 1950 to 1966 at Durham University, President from 1975–7 of the Mineralogical Society and from 1969 to 1972 of the International Union of Geological Sciences
 Ronald Hedley CB, zoologist
 Trevor Horn, musician and music producer
 Barry Laight OBE, engineer and aircraft designer, who became Technical Director of Blackburn Aircraft, chief designer for the Blackburn Buccaneer, then for Hawker Siddeley, helped design the Hawk (as well as the cancelled supersonic P.1154), and President from 1974 to 1975 of the Royal Aeronautical Society (RAeS)
 Prof John Laing, Courtauld Professor of Animal Husbandry and Hygiene from 1959 to 1984 at the Royal Veterinary College, and President from 1996 to 1998 of the World Association for Transport Animal Welfare and Studies
 Madeleine Moon MP
 Michael Shields CBE, Chief executive from 1998 to 2003 of the Northwest Regional Development Agency, Trafford Park Development Corporation from 1987 to 1998 and Trafford Borough Council from 1983 to 1987
 Prof. David Burn, Pro-Vice-Chancellor, Faculty of Medical Sciences, Newcastle University since 2017; National Clinical Director, Parkinson's UK
 Gerry Steinberg, Labour MP from 1987 to 2005 of the City of Durham
 Prof Sir Graham Teasdale, Professor and Head of Department of Neurosurgery from 1981 to 2003 at the University of Glasgow, President from 1994 to 1998 of the International Neurotrauma Society, and from 2000–2 of the Society of British Neurological Surgeons, and invented the Glasgow Coma Scale GCS (with Bryan Jennett)
 John Towers CBE, Chairman of Rover Group from 2000–05 and general manager from 1983 to 1986 of Perkins Engines
 Paul West, Chief Constable since 2003 of West Mercia Police
 Frederick Willey, Labour MP from 1945 to 1950 for Sunderland and from 1950 to 1983 for Sunderland North
 Prof Thomas D. Wilson, Professor Emeritus at the University of Sheffield, formerly Head of the Department of Information Studies.
 John Pollack, author and speech writer for President Bill Clinton
 Amanda Pritchard, Chief Executive of NHS England

See also
 List of schools in Durham

References

http://www.journallive.co.uk/north-east-news/todays-news/2010/06/29/durham-johnston-school-officially-opened-61634-26745324/

http://www.durham-johnston.durham.sch.uk/index.php?option=com_content&view=article&id=131:durham-johnston-war-memorial-1921-2011&catid=6:events&Itemid=9

http://www.journallive.co.uk/north-east-news/todays-news/2011/02/05/durham-johnston-s-war-memorial-is-re-dedicated-61634-28117324/

http://www.durhamtimes.co.uk/news/4318300.First_lessons_held_at_new_look_Durham_Johnston/

http://www.durhamtimes.co.uk/news/8904653.Johnston_success_is_no_debate/

http://www.journallive.co.uk/north-east-news/todays-news/2011/03/18/durham-johnston-school-wins-competition-61634-28357694/

http://www.journallive.co.uk/north-east-news/todays-news/2011/03/24/durham-johnston-school-pays-tribute-to-war-heroes-61634-28395240/

'A History of Durham Johnston School' Michael Robson

Jewish Historical Studies volume 41 2007

External links
 Official website
 EduBase

News items
 New school plans in August 2007
 School plans in September 2006
 New school announced in April 2005

Schools in Durham, England
Educational institutions established in 1979
Secondary schools in County Durham
1979 establishments in England
Community schools in County Durham